Lake Balaton is a lake in Hungary, the largest lake in Central Europe.

Balaton may also refer to:

 2242 Balaton, a main-belt asteroid
 Balaton (car), a Hungarian microcar
 Balaton (village), in Heves county, Hungary
 Balaton, Minnesota, a city in the US
 Balaton cheese, a type of Hungarian semi-hard cheese made from cow's milk
 Balaton cherry
 Principality of Lower Pannonia or Balaton Principality ( 839–901), a Slavic state